Paint Cans is a 1994 Canadian comedy film written, produced and directed by Paul Donovan and based on his book of the same name. A satire of Canadian film and television production, the film stars Chas Lawther as Wick Burns, a bureaucrat in the Film Finance Office of Canada (a parody of Telefilm Canada) who is trying to help secure funding for Paint Cans, the directorial debut of his film school classmate Vittorio Russo (Bruce Greenwood), while simultaneously trying to navigate a new romantic relationship with Arundel Merton (Robyn Stevan), a journalist he met at the Cannes Film Festival.

Production on the film began in 1993, although some filming had to be postponed to early 1994 after Stevan broke her collarbone in a fall from a scooter.

The film premiered in the Perspective Canada program at the 1994 Toronto International Film Festival. It was subsequently screened at the 1994 Atlantic Film Festival, where it won the awards for Best Direction and Best Writing in an Atlantic Canadian Film.

Cast
Chas Lawther as Wick Burns
Robyn Stevan as Arundel Merton
Bruce Greenwood as Vittorio Musso
Nigel Bennett as Bryson Vautour
Don Francks as Maitland Burns
Andy Jones as Neville Lewis
Paul Gross as Morton Ridgewell
Ann-Marie MacDonald as Inge Von Nerthus
Neve Campbell as Tristesse

References

External links
 
 

1994 films
1994 comedy films
Canadian comedy films
English-language Canadian films
Films based on Canadian novels
Films directed by Paul Donovan
1990s English-language films
1990s Canadian films